Woo Min-ho (born 1971) is a South Korean film director and screenwriter. Woo debuted with the revenge thriller Man of Vendetta (2010), followed by the action comedy thriller The Spies (2012), both starred Kim Myung-min in the lead. His latest political thriller Inside Men (2015), based on Yoon Tae-ho's webtoon The Insiders which focused on the corrupt systems existing in Korea, the film focused on the intense competition between the characters themselves. Starring Lee Byung-hun, it was a hit with more than 5.7 million admissions as of December 12, 2015.

Filmography 
Who killed Jesus? (short film, 2000) - director, screenwriter
Man of Vendetta (2010) - director, screenwriter
The Spies (2012) - director, screenwriter
Inside Men (2015) - director, screenwriter
The Drug King (2018) - director, screenwriter
The Man Standing Next (2020)  - director

Awards 
2016 53rd Grand Bell Awards: Best Director (Inside Men)
2016 53rd Grand Bell Awards: Best Screenplay (Inside Men)

References

External links 
 
 
 

1971 births
Living people
South Korean film directors
South Korean screenwriters